Nikolai Yevgrafovich Sokolov (May 12, 1897 in Moscow – December 15, 1988 in Razliv, Leningrad Oblast) was a Soviet football player.

Honours
 RSFSR champion: 1920, 1922.
 USSR champion: 1920.

International career
Sokolov made his debut for USSR on November 16, 1924 in a friendly against Turkey.

External links
  Profile

1897 births
1988 deaths
Russian footballers
Soviet footballers
Soviet Union international footballers
Association football goalkeepers
Burials at Serafimovskoe Cemetery
FC Dynamo Saint Petersburg players
Footballers from Moscow